Megan Fisher (born March 1, 1983) is a Canadian-American Paralympic athlete. She has won one gold, two silver, and one bronze medal for Team USA at the Paralympic Games.

Early life and education
Fisher grew up as an only child near Calgary, Alberta. After her parents separated, she moved to Hinsdale, Illinois, with her mother and divided her time with her father.

Fisher was a walk-on at the University of Montana's NCAA Division 1 tennis team, which she played during her freshman year. While driving with her friend back to school for their sophomore year on June 30, 2002, they were both injured in a car accident. After being pulled out of the car by a witness, Fisher's left leg was amputated; her friend died due to her injuries. Less than a year after the accident, Fisher returned to the University of Montana and competed in a triathlon following a second leg surgery.

Career
Fisher met Paralympic cyclist Sam Kavanaugh, who inspired her to begin competing in para-cycling and eventually the USA Paralympic team. In 2010, Fisher competed in the TRI-5 classification and won the International Triathlon Union Paratriathlon World Championship in Budapest, Hungary, and won the 2010 USA Paratriathlon National Championship in the TRI-5 division. She also became the first female lower-leg amputee to complete an XTERRA off-road triathlon.

Prior to leaving for the 2012 Summer Paralympics, Fisher began studying for her doctorate in physical therapy at the University of Washington. In London, she competed in Paralympic cycling, winning both a gold and silver medal. Her gold medal came in the C4 time trial and her silver in the track pursuit.

The next year, Fisher won gold in the C4 classification at the 2013 UCI Para-cycling Road World Championships. As a result of winning the 2013 ITU Paratriathlon World Championships, her third world championship title, Fisher was honored by the United States Olympic Committee as USOC Athlete of the Month. She was later named to Team USA's 2015 UCI Para-cycling Road World Championships roster.

In 2016, Fisher was selected to compete with Team USA at the 2016 Summer Paralympics, where she won a silver medal after losing to teammate Shawn Morelli in the C4 road timed trial. She also ended the games with a bronze medal in the 3000M individual pursuit.

References

External links 
 Team USA profile

Living people
1983 births
American female cyclists
Cyclists from Alberta
Canadian emigrants to the United States
University of Montana alumni
Paralympic bronze medalists for the United States
Paralympic silver medalists for the United States
Paralympic gold medalists for the United States
Cyclists at the 2012 Summer Paralympics
Cyclists at the 2016 Summer Paralympics
Medalists at the 2016 Summer Paralympics
Medalists at the 2012 Summer Paralympics
Paralympic medalists in cycling
Paralympic cyclists of the United States